Hoya carnosa, the porcelainflower or wax plant, is a species of flowering plant in the dogbane family Apocynaceae. It is one of the many species of Hoya that are native to Eastern Asia and Australia. It is a common house plant grown for its attractive waxy foliage, and sweetly scented flowers. It is grown well in pots and hanging baskets.

Hoya carnosa has been in cultivation for more than 200 years and has given rise to many cultivars that vary in foliage form or flower color. In cultivation in the UK it has gained the Royal Horticultural Society's Award of Garden Merit.

Description
Hoya carnosa makes faintly succulent shoots with smooth, pale gray, and bare surfaces that twine and climb. The perennial leaves are wide oval to longitudinal oval or heart-shaped. The spindle-shaped fruits measure 6 to 10 × 0.5 to 1.5 cm.

Flowers

The inflorescence is made up of numerous flowers, hanging or more upright, which are grouped in an umbel. The flowers are typically light pink, but may vary from near-white to dark pink; they are star-shaped, and are borne in clusters. The thick flower corollas look as if made from porcelaine or from wax, leading to the plant's common names. The surface of the flowers is covered in tiny hairs giving them a fuzzy sheen. They are heavily scented and may produce excess nectar that drips from the flowers. A single flower (corolla) has a diameter of 1.5 to 2 cm.

Like most species of Hoya, H. carnosa flowers from specialised perennial peduncles; sometimes these structures are referred to as spurs. These appear from the axils of the leaves and stem; flowers may not be produced when the spurs first appear, but in time buds emerge from their tips. New flowers are produced on these same spurs every year, so they should not be removed. 

The plant flowers from spring to late summer, it can produce umbels of 10 to 50 small star-shaped flowers that mature gradually (2 to 3 weeks) on the same peduncle. The scent is nocturnal with a pheromonal tendency.

Distribution and habitat
This species is found in Queensland (Australia), East India, southern China (Fujian, Guangdong and Yunnan provinces, and Guangxi autonomous region), Taiwan, Myanmar, Vietnam, Malaysia, the Japanese islands of Kyushu and Ryukyu, where it grows in humid subtropical forests, and the Fiji Islands.

Cultivation 
This Hoya species prefers bright light, but will tolerate much less. It can be propagated by air layering or by stem cuttings. It benefits from an open potting medium that allows some air to get to the roots. Typical mixes include large-grade drainage material such as perlite, pumice, or ceramic balls. The plants should be fed regularly with a fertilizer suitable for epiphytic plants.

There is a persistent piece of folklore that hoyas prefer to be potbound - kept in a small pot. It is said that this will hasten flowering.

Studies at the University of Georgia, published in 2009, have shown H. carnosa to be an excellent remover of pollutants in the indoor environment.

var. Compacta 

A variant of Hoya, Hoya carnosa var. compacta, is known as the Hindu rope plant, and is characterized by its folded, curled leaves, which grow along vines resembling ropes.  The inflorescences of this variant tend to take on a pinkish color.

Gallery

References

Bibliography
 Hoya carnosa: information in The Plant List

carnosa
Flora of Indo-China
Flora of Queensland
Flora of Fiji
Flora of Malaysia
Flora of Japan
Flora of Taiwan
Flora of the Ryukyu Islands
Flora of Myanmar
Flora of Vietnam
Flora of China
Garden plants of Asia
House plants
Vines
Plants described in 1810